Mother's Boy is a 1913 short comedy film starring Fatty Arbuckle.

Cast
 Phyllis Allen
 Roscoe 'Fatty' Arbuckle
 Nick Cogley
 Alice Davenport
 Billy Gilbert (as Little Billy Gilbert)
 Edgar Kennedy

See also
 List of American films of 1913
 Fatty Arbuckle filmography

References

External links

1913 films
1913 comedy films
1913 short films
American silent short films
American black-and-white films
Films directed by Henry Lehrman
Silent American comedy films
American comedy short films
1910s American films